Redu (also called The Radio) is a 2018 Marathi-Malvani language Indian film directed by Sagar Chhaya Vanjari and produced by Navalkishor Sarda and Vidhi Kasliwal. The film stars Shashank Shende and Chhaya Kadam in lead roles. A Landmarc Films Presentation and a Naval Films Production in association with Blink Motion Pictures, Redu was released in theatres on 18 May 2018 after a successful run in National & International Film Festivals.

Plot
Redu is the story of Tatu and his family living in a humble village in Konkan, set in the early 1970s. Tatu a short-tempered, irate middle-aged simpleton, is fascinated and curious to see a ‘redu’, a small portable radio, for the first time in his life.

Serendipitous circumstances allow him to possess a ‘redu’ himself. The gadget makes his ordinary life full of excitement and fun. And the people in his village start looking at him in a different light once he possesses this marvel of an innovation. It ups his common status to a special one. And Tatu gets very attached to this ‘redu’, the newest member of his family, and everything it brings with it. But nothing lasts forever ... a sudden loss of his prized possession leaves Tatu disheartened and dejected. Refusing to accept this altered reality, Tatu embarks on a quest to reclaim what once belonged to him. Redu is a humorous bittersweet story of one man's life, love, values, and his will to go on despite the odds, set against the spectacular backdrop of rural Konkan.

Cast

 Shashank Shende as Tatu
 Chhaya Kadam as Chhaya
 Gauri Konge as Suman
 Vinamra Bhabal as Baban
 Runmayi Supal as Saru

Soundtrack

The songs were composed by Vijay Narayan Gavande with lyrics by Guru Thakur and Vijay Narayan Gavande himself.

Critical reception
Mihir Bhanage of The Times of India gave the film a 3.5 out of 5 ratings, saying that Redu warms up with a light-hearted approach and gradually develops into an emotionally rewarding experience. Though the film is in Malvani, the language doesn't act as a barrier. This one is definitely worth a watch.

Just a couple of weeks prior to its release, Redu won Best Film, Best Director, Best Actor and 4 more Maharashtra State Awards.

References

External links
 

2010s Marathi-language films